The Kamchatka Mountain tundra and forest tundra ecoregion (WWF ID: PA1105) is an ecoregion that covers the central mountain range of the Kamchatka Peninsula in the Russian Far East. The region is one of volcanos, caldera, geysers, and mountain tundra. It is in the Palearctic realm and tundra biome.

Location and description 

The ecoregion covers the higher elevations of the Sredinny Range - the central mountain ridge of Kamchatka stretching about 700 km from northeast to southwest and the Eastern Range along the southeast coast.  The ecoregion is surrounded by the Kamchatka-Kurile meadows and sparse forests ecoregion, which covers the low river valleys and coastal lands.

Climate 
The region has a Humid continental climate - cool summer subtype (Koppen classification Dfc). Mean precipitation is about 604 mm/year.

Flora and fauna 
The ecoregion is the southernmost large expanse of Arctic tundra floral community in the world (51-60 degrees N).  The area is notable for "azonal" floral communities - habitats that form around hot springs, volcanic activity, and mountain lakes.  Most floral communities are, however, grouped by altitude zones.  Erman's birch (Betula ermanii) forms a zonal vegetation belt at 600–800 m in the mountains; above which are alpine grasses and tundra floral groups.

Protections 
There are several significant nationally protected area that reach into this ecoregion, including:

 Kronotsky Nature Reserve, on the southeast side of the peninsula, protecting an area of volcanoes and geysers.

See also 
 List of ecoregions in Russia

References

External links 
 Holocene Volcanos of Kamchatka (map)

Ecoregions of Russia
Palearctic ecoregions
Tundra ecoregions